Erythrus sabahanus is a species of beetle in the family Cerambycidae found in Asia in countries such as Malaysia.

Cerambycinae
Beetles described in 2010